Festo Lutaya was an Anglican bishop who served in Uganda.

Lutaya was educated at Uganda Christian University. He was ordained deacon in 1931 and priest in 1932. He served in the Diocese of Uganda and was its assistant bishop from 1952. He was Bishop of West Buganda from 1960 to 1965.

References

20th-century Anglican bishops in Uganda
Uganda Christian University alumni
Anglican bishops of West Buganda